The redspot chub (Nocomis asper) is a species of freshwater fish found primarily in the Ozark uplands of the Arkansas River drainage in northwestern Arkansas, southwestern Missouri, southeastern Kansas, and northeastern Oklahoma. It can grow to  total length

References 

Chubs (fish)
Nocomis
Freshwater fish of the United States
Endemic fauna of the United States
Taxa named by Ernest A. Lachner
Taxa named by Robert E. Jenkins
Fish described in 1971